Tim Peterson is a Canadian retired swimmer who specialized in long-distance freestyle events.  He was a member of the Canadian Olympic team in 2000, and was also a member of the Canadian squad at the 1998 Commonwealth Games in Kuala Lumpur, Malaysia.

Peterson competed in the men's 1500-metre freestyle at the 2000 Summer Olympics in Sydney.  He eclipsed a FINA A-standard entry time of 15:26.05, after finishing second from the Canadian Olympic Trials in Winnipeg, Manitoba.  He challenged seven other swimmers in heat four, including his 17-year-old teammate Andrew Hurd, and Australia's two-time Olympic champion Kieren Perkins. He rounded out the field to last place by almost four seconds behind Hurd in a time of 15:34.94.  Peterson failed to reach the top-8 final, as he placed twenty-seventh overall on the last day of preliminaries.

References

External links
Profile – Canadian Olympic Team
Profile – Canoe.ca

Living people
Canadian male freestyle swimmers
Olympic swimmers of Canada
Swimmers at the 1998 Commonwealth Games
Swimmers at the 1999 Pan American Games
Swimmers at the 2000 Summer Olympics
UBC Thunderbirds swimmers
Pan American Games competitors for Canada
Commonwealth Games competitors for Canada